USS Clermont (APA-143) was a Haskell-class attack transport in service with the United States Navy from 1945 to 1946. She was scrapped in 1973.

History
Clermont (APA-143) was launched 25 November 1944 by California Shipbuilding Corp., Wilmington, California, under a Maritime Commission contract; sponsored by Mrs. F. Wells; acquired by the Navy 27 January 1945; converted at Kaiser Co., Inc., Vancouver, Washington; and commissioned 28 January 1945.

Clermont sailed from Port Chicago, California, 10 April 1945 for Pearl Harbor, arriving 16 April. Here she conducted training, then embarked the 126th Construction Battalion. She cleared Pearl Harbor 20 May, for Eniwetok, Ulithi, and Okinawa, arriving 24 June to disembark her troops and cargo. She returned to San Francisco 21 July to embark passengers for Pearl Harbor, arriving there 9 August. After taking Marine units and the 116th Naval Construction Battalion on board, she cleared 1 September for Saipan and Sasebo, where she put her passengers ashore for the occupation of Sasebo Naval Base. After a voyage to the Philippines to carry additional occupation troops to Japan, she carried units of the 5th Marines from Sasebo to Peleliu and sailed on 3 November with homeward bound servicemen to San Diego, arriving 23 November.  Clermont made a second "Operation Magic Carpet" voyage between 8 December 1945 and 11 January 1946. Eleven days later she sailed for Norfolk, Virginia, arriving 4 February.

Decommissioning and fate
Clermont was decommissioned 1 March 1946, and returned to the Maritime Commission 3 March 1946. Ex-Clermont was laid up in the National Defense Reserve Fleet at James River, Virginia.  Between 8 July and 28 September 1955 she was withdrawn from the Reserve Fleet for a Repair Program, GAA- Polarus, and returned. Ex-Clermont was sold for $111,560 to Union Minerals & Alloys Corporation for scrapping on 9 April 1973. In September 1973 she was withdrawn from the Reserve Fleet and sent to the breaker's yard.

Awards 
Clermont received one battle star for World War II service at Okinawa.

References

External links 

Navsource.org photo archive - USS Clermont (APA-143)

Victory ships
Ships built in Los Angeles
Haskell-class attack transports
World War II amphibious warfare vessels of the United States
Clermont County, Ohio
Troop ships
1944 ships